Dhankuta District is one of 14 districts of Koshi Province of eastern Nepal. Dhankuta is the district headquarters of Dhankuta District.

History

Dhankuta was a part of Kirat Region before unification of those parts into Kingdom of Nepal.

After 1816 there were 10 districts in Nepal and Dhankuta-chainpur district was one of them. All land from east of Dudhkosi river to the Mechi river was one district Dhankuta-chainpur.

From 1885 to 1962 Nepal remained divided into 32 districts and there were six districts in eastern-hill region: East No. 1, East No. 2, East No. 3, East No. 4, Ilam and Dhankuta. Dhankuta was center of these districts. That time also dhankuta was a large (by area) district. Current Sankhuwasabha, Tehrathum, Taplejung, Panchthar and Dhankuta districts were Incorporated under one district.

In 1962, Nepal divided into 75 districts and 16 districts of eastern Nepal grouped to form Eastern Development Region and Dhankuta became the headquarter of it.

Geography and Climate
Dhankuta is a mid-hill district of eastern hill region of Nepal. It is situated between 26°53' to 27°19' north latitude and 87°8' to 88°33' east longitude.

Vegetation
The vegetation zones in the district range from sub-tropical Sal forest along the Tamor and Arun rivers, and cooler temperate forests on some of the high ridges that mark the watershed between the two catchments.  The altitude ranges from around 300m to 2500m.  The majority of the population are involved in agriculture and crops include maize, rice and millet.  Important cash crops include citrus fruits, cauliflower, cabbage, ginger, and in recent years, tea. A well-preserved forest (Rani Ban – Queen's Forest) spreads along a ridge line on the northwest side of the village, with well-developed mature stands of rhododendron and sallo (pine) trees.

Demographics
At the time of the 2011 Nepal census, Dhankuta District had a population of 163,412. Of these, 43.3% spoke Nepali, 12.5% Limbu, 9.7% Bantawa, 9.3% Magar, 5.7% Tamang, 3.5% Rai, 3.4% Athpariya, 3.0% Yakkha, 2.3% Chintang, 2.1% Newar, 1.2% Chulung, 0.7% Yamphu, 0.5% Maithili, 0.4% Sherpa, 0.3% Chamling, 0.3% Gurung, 0.2% Bhujel, 0.2% Phangduwali, 0.1% Bhojpuri, 0.1% Hindi, 0.1% Lohorung, 0.1% Majhi, 0.1% Nachhiring, 0.1% Sampang, 0.1% Tharu, 0.1% Urdu, 0.1% Wambule and 0.3% other languages as their first language.

In terms of ethnicity/caste, 20.2% were Chhetri, 19.8% Rai, 13.1% Limbu, 9.7% Magar, 6.5% Tamang, 5.3% Hill Brahmin, 4.7% Newar, 3.8% Kami, 3.6% Aathpariya, 3.1% Yakkha, 2.1% Damai/Dholi, 1.4% Gurung, 1.4% Sarki, 1.2% Gharti/Bhujel, 0.6% Majhi, 0.6% Sanyasi/Dasnami, 0.6% Yamphu, 0.5% Sherpa, 0.4% Thakuri, 0.1% Badi, 0.1% Bantawa, 0.1% Musalman, 0.1% Teli, 0.1% Tharu, 0.1% Yadav and 0.5% others.

In terms of religion, 49.2% were Hindu, 34.9% Kirati, 13.6% Buddhist, 1.8% Christian, 0.1% Muslim, 0.1% Prakriti and 0.3% others.

In terms of literacy, 74.0% could read and write, 2.0% could only read and 23.9% could neither read nor write.

Divisions
Dhankuta is divided into 3 urban municipalities and 4 rural municipalities.

Former divisions
Formerly Dhankuta was divided into 2 municipalities and many Village development committees.

Dhankuta Municipality
Ahale
Ankhisalla
Arkhaule Jitpur
Basantatar
Belahara
Bhirgaun
Bodhe
Budhabare
Budi Morang
Chanuwa
Chhintang
Chungmang
Danda Bazar
Dandagaun
Ghorlikharka (now Pakhribas Municipality)
Hattikharka
Jitpur Arkhaule
Khoku
Khuwaphok
Kuruletenupa
Leguwa
Mahabharat
Marek Katahare
Maunabudhuk
Mudebas
Muga (now Pakhribas Municipality)
Murtidhunga
Pakhribas (now Pakhribas Municipality)
Pakhribas Municipality
Parewadin
Phaksib
Phalate (now Pakhribas Municipality)
Raja Rani
Sanne (now Pakhribas Municipality)
Tankhuwa
Telia
Vedatar

Constituencies
Dhankuta District has a single Parliamentary constituency and 2 Provincial constituencies:

Transportation

Dhankuta, the headquarter (center) of Dhankuta District is connected with NH-08 (Koshi Highway), which connects Dhankuta with NH-01 (East-west Highway) at Itahari. The NH-08 also connects Dhankuta to northern hill and mountainous area.

Tourist areas
Hile
Pakhribas
Bhedetar
Namaste Waterfall
Chintang Devi temple

See also
Zones of Nepal

References

External links

District Development Committee, Dhankuta

 
Districts of Koshi Province
Districts of Nepal established during Rana regime or before